Munich-Freiham station is a railway station in the Aubing-Lochhausen-Langwied borough of Munich, Germany.

References

External links

Munich S-Bahn stations
Freiham
Railway stations in Germany opened in 2013